The Hinterrugg (or Hinderrugg) is the highest peak of the Churfirsten group, located in the Appenzell Alps. It overlooks the town of Walenstadt and the lake in the canton of St. Gallen. The summit is easily accessible via the Chäserrugg cable car station (2,262 metres), above Unterwasser in Toggenburg.

The Hinterrugg is a well-known location for BASE jumping.

References

External links
Hinterrugg - the highest of the seven Churfirsten peaks

Mountains of the Alps
Mountains of Switzerland
Mountains of the canton of St. Gallen
Appenzell Alps